The 1936–37 British Home Championship was a football tournament played between the British Home Nations during the 1936–37 seasons. The trophy was won by Wales with Scotland coming second. This was the last Home Championship that Wales would win exclusively, all subsequent victories would be shared with one of the other Home Nations. Wales began the competition by beating England and followed it with a similar 2–1 victory against Scotland. With the two favourites beaten Wales only required a draw with Ireland to complete a rare tournament success. They ultimately took the title in style, winning 4–1 at home. Scotland recovered from their loss to Wales in their final game with a commanding 3–1 victory over England in Glasgow to come second, whilst England's only points came from their own 3–1 defeat of the disappointing Irish.

Table

Results

References 

1936–37 in English football
1936–37 in Scottish football
Brit
1937 in British sport
1936-37
1936–37 in Northern Ireland association football